Jon Worth (born 23 May 1980) is a political blogger, journalist and editor who regularly writes about EU policy, Brexit and Germany policy. Since 2015 he has been a visiting professor at the College of Europe.

Worth studied Philosophy, Politics and Economics at Merton College, University of Oxford, where he obtained a BA. He also holds an MA in European Politics from the College of Europe, Bruges. Jon Worth's "Euroblog" started in 2005. It was ranked the third most influential left-of-center blog in 2010 by Social Europe. 

In his political work, he was president of the NGO Young European Federalists Europe between 2003 and 2005. In British politics, he was responsible for the online campaign for Harriet Harman's 2007 run to be Labour Party Deputy Leader and also did online campaigning for Diane Abbott's Labour Leadership bid in 2010. He was one of the founders of the Atheist Bus Campaign in 2008, the campaign having first been visualized in his blog entry "In your face atheism?". In 2013, at the time of his move to Berlin, he quit the Labour Party and joined the German Greens, where he ran in the 2016 local elections

He is a Visiting Professor at the College of Europe in Bruges, where he has been teaching since the 2015–16 academic year. He teaches students in the politics department about online communications and the EU and (together with Pierpaolo Settembri and Costanza Hermanin) runs the negotiation simulation.

As a UK citizen in Germany, he has regularly appeared in the German media to talk about Brexit.  

He is a member of the Europe Policy Group of World Economic Forum and the Transparency International EU Advisory Group.

In the summer of 2022 he started the #CrossBorderRail campaign to ask attention for the issues with the European rail network, and specifically the border connections between countries.

References

External links 
 Jon Worth Euroblog
 Profile The Guardian
 Jon Worth on Twitter
 Jon Worth at College of Europe

1980 births
Living people
Welsh bloggers
Writers from Berlin
Welsh journalists